Chekhovo is a health resort in the Republic of Bashkortostan, Russia, located south-west of Ufa, in Alsheyevsky District of the republic.

Buildings and structures in Bashkortostan